Dayouth or Dayyuth is an Arabic-derived term for a person who is apathetic or permissive with regards to unchaste behaviour by female relatives or a spouse. 

More specifically, dayouth describes a man who lacks the demeanor (Ghayrah) of paternalistic protectiveness with regards to female family members or his spouse. There are many variations in how dayouth is spelled, including dayyuth, dayuuth, or dayoos. Related terms in English may include cuckold or wittold.

The term dayouth has historically held religious, legal and familial implications, depending on time and region, especially if a liaison results in pregnancy. Arabs of various religions, often conceive the concept of the dayouth in a negative light, either personally or scripturally. The term has also permeated into populations that have religious denominations with such explications (such as Islamic jurisprudence) or geographically adjacent populations where the term is in usage. 

The public perception within non-Arab communities that have adopted the notion of the dayouth as a loan-word varies. This ranges from criticism of its usage as an pejorative being suggestive of acceptance of vain paternalistic gender roles, stigmatization of sexuality or overprotective intrusive sexual gatekeeping within a household and thereby an approval of patronization, to acceptance of its usage in instances where there is an affront to modesty or the archetype of religiously inspired abstinence.

Hadith
The word dayyuth has been mentioned in hadith,

References

Arabic words and phrases
Gender and Islam
Sexuality in Islam
Modesty in Islam